Katharsis (also known as Blaster!) is a horizontally scrolling shooter from Polish developer Metropolis Software House and published by CD Projekt in 1997.

Plot
In the year 2616, a ship leaves Earth and 18 months later the planet loses contact with the vessel. In 4720 AD, Earth is attacked by a foreign ship and the player is one of the few survivors. Their mission is to protect a bomb that will be used to destroy the enemy base.

Gameplay

Development
Led by Polish developer Adrian Chmielarz, the team aimed to combine classical mechanisms for scrolling shooters with the increase in capabilities of IBM PC compatibles of the late twentieth century. The Polish premiere of the game took place on March 1, 1997; the game received online and television press and a competition was created. It had a US premiere on June 6, 1997.

Reception
Meristation called the graphics and sound "novel". The AV Vault thought the game put more attention into its graphics than its controls. MerixStudio felt the game was surprisingly deep, complex and mysterious, and a notable example of Polish developers entering the side-scrolling market.

References

External links 

 Review in PC Player

1997 video games
DOS games
DOS-only games
Horizontally scrolling shooters
Single-player video games
Video games developed in Poland
Video games set in the future
Metropolis Software games
CD Projekt games